Sharps Run may refer to:

Sharps Run (New Jersey), a stream in New Jersey
Sharps Run (Cow Creek), a stream in West Virginia